Grunge fashion is the clothing, accessories and hairstyles of the grunge music genre and subculture which emerged in mid-1980s Seattle, and had reached wide popularity by the mid 90s. Grunge fashion is characterized by durable and timeless thrift-store clothing, often worn in a loose, androgynous manner to de-emphasize the silhouette. The style was popularized by music bands Nirvana, Soundgarden and Pearl Jam.

Origins
The term grunge was adopted by the music industry for a style of music that had become wildly popular in the American northwest during the early 1990s. The term first appeared in 1972, but it did not become a popular term in widespread media until the late 1980s, influenced by the surge and decline of punk. This view made its mark on the youth of the time and translated into their choice of fashion. "Punk is anti-fashion, it makes a statement, while grunge is about not making a statement, which is why it's crazy for it to become a fashion statement." Details editor James Truman said. Therefore, grunge look is different from the punk look. Punk musicians usually wear leather jacket, ripped jeans, shirt without sleeves, metal chains, and dark clothes. In contrast, grunge rockers in Seattle wore mundane everyday clothing to everywhere. For example, Kurt Cobain, singer-guitarist of Nirvana, would simply wear an oversized striped sweater, ripped jeans, a pair of Converse, and an unkempt hair to perform. This low-key style from the Pacific Northwest became popular as grunge entered the mainstream. In a 1998 article for the Journal of Cultural Geography, Thomas Bell said "Flannel shirts and Doc Martens boots were worn as an anti-fashion statement that is undoubtedly related to the unassuming and unvarnished nature of the music itself".

Pop-culture influence on 90s grunge 
One of the biggest influences on grunge fashion was rock star Kurt Cobain, the lead singer of the hugely successful band Nirvana. It is widely believed that Cobain represents the core of the grunge movement and the phenomenon of the grunge scene's influence. Cobain's style was a combination from both male and female fashion, and "his Seattle thrift-store look ran the gamut of masculine lumberjack workwear and 40s-by-way-of-70s feminine dresses." Cobain's wife, Courtney Love, was mostly known for her "kinderwhore" sense of style which was used by many female grunge bands. The look consisted of barrettes, tiaras, ripped tights, Mary Janes, slips and Peter Pan collared dresses. Love claims that she drew the inspiration for her kinderwhore look from Christina Amphlett of Divinyls. Pearl Jam made their mark on the grunge fashion scene with leather jackets, corduroy jackets, kilts, shorts-over-leggings, ripped jeans and snapbacks. They were best known for inspiring the Doc Martens trend.

Men's fashion 
Grunge fashion/style was influenced by disheveled and androgynous thrift-store clothing, defined by a looseness that de-emphasizes the body's silhouette. Men wear second-hand or shabby T-shirts with slogans, band logos, etc. A plaid shirt might accompany the T-shirt, along with ripped or faded jeans. Black combat-style boots, such as Doc Martens, completes the ensemble. In 1992, The New York Times wrote: "This stuff is cheap, it's durable, and it's kind of timeless. It also runs against the grain of the whole flashy aesthetic that existed in the 80's." As for hairstyles, men follow the "hair-sweat-and-guitars look" of Kurt Cobain.

Women's fashion 
In the 1990s, less was more and dressing-down was an acceptable norm.  For shoes, women started wearing clunky combat boots and Doc Martens. They typically wore slip dresses with flannels, flannels and ripped jeans, and plaid in layers. Low-rise and ripped, wide-legged jeans were popular. The clothing was paired with simple jewelry such as chokers and hoop earrings and dark, rich-colored lipstick. Bell-bottom jeans from the 1970s were popular again by 1995, along with the baby-doll T-shirt.  When flannels were worn, they were oversized and when it became too hot to wear them, they were tied around the waist.  Hairstyles included the half-up-half-down style and messy hair that made the impression nothing was done to it.

Designer 
When grunge started to be a popular trend in the early 1990s, fashion designer Marc Jacobs was the first designer who brought grunge to the luxury platform. In 1993, Jacobs as the creative director of women's design at Perry Ellis, debuted a spring collection that was inspired by grunge. The collection included some iconic grunge items such as flannel shirts, printed granny dresses, Dr. Martens boots, and knitted skullcaps. Fashion critic Suzy Menkes declared "Grunge is ghastly." New York magazine said, "Grunge: 1992–1993, R.I.P." A few years later, Jacobs and his business partner joined the French luxury brand Louis Vuitton in 1997.

Grunge in the 2010s 

According to a 2013 Today article, the 1990s made a comeback after New York Fashion Week (NYFW) when designers shared their interpretations of Seattle's early 1990s boho-chic. This led to grunge fashion appearing in shopping malls and grunge-inspired back-to-school looks.

In 2013, Yves Saint Laurent and Dries van Noten were trying to bring grunge back to the runway and made it a trend again.

References 

Grunge
1980s fashion
1990s fashion
2000s fashion
2010s fashion
Fashion aesthetics
History of fashion